Yekaterina Dmitrichenko (born 16 October 2001) is an inactive Kazakhstani tennis player.

Dmitrichenko has a career-high WTA ranking of 723 in singles, achieved on 9 September 2019. She also has a career-high WTA ranking of 527 in doubles, achieved on 2 March 2020.

Dmitrichenko made her WTA Tour main-draw debut at the 2021 Astana Open, after receiving a wildcard for the doubles tournament.

ITF Circuit finals

Doubles: 10 (2 titles, 8 runner-ups)

References

External links
 
 

2001 births
Living people
Kazakhstani female tennis players
21st-century Kazakhstani women